Brampton Gateway Terminal is a Brampton Transit bus station serving the south-central and western areas of Brampton, Ontario. It is located on the north-west corner of Steeles Avenue and Main Street adjoining the Shoppers World Brampton shopping centre. The terminal opened on November 26, 2012 to replace the Shoppers World Terminal on the south-west side of the shopping centre.

History
In 2009, the manager of Land Use Policy recommended that, with the addition of Acceleride (later Züm) and a proposed Hurontario–Main LRT, there was a "demonstrated need" to move the terminal to the corner of Hurontario and Steeles. Such a move would allow less diversion time from the route to the station, and for a larger station.

As a stop on the potential LRT, the terminal is considered part of the Hurontario Higher Order Transit corridor. Expropriations were made to allow for the terminal to be moved; this stands in contrast to the previous location which was leased from Shoppers World Brampton. As of spring 2010, the terminal redesign and relocation was scheduled to coincide with the Zum Main Street launch in fall 2011; it was listed as a 2011 service initiative in the agency's 2011 Current and Capital Budget.

A contract for the construction of the new terminal, its amenities, plus road and intersection improvements was awarded  to Graham Construction and Engineering. The lowest tender, the contract was worth $10,190,340. Earlier estimates presumed an $8.3 million cost. A City report placed the "higher actual costs" on a limited construction time-line and tendering the contract during the summer.

The bus station will be the northern terminus of the Hurontario LRT which extends south to Port Credit GO Station in Mississauga. The light rail line is scheduled for completion in 2024.

Routes
This terminal has 15 bus bays with several of them being on the streets.

References

Brampton Transit
Bus stations in Ontario
Transport infrastructure completed in 2012
2012 establishments in Ontario
Hurontario LRT
Railway stations scheduled to open in 2024